Rhasaan Orange (born August 25, 1975) is an American comedian and actor. Orange is, perhaps, best known for his creation and portrayal of the fictional Brazilian Renato Laranja. The Laranja persona is an arrogant Brazilian Jiu-Jitsu champion with a thick accent, and the character is somewhat of an alter ego; 'Laranja' is Portuguese for 'Orange'.  Although Orange never grappled professionally, he earned a black belt rank in 10th Planet Jiu-Jitsu studying under Eddie Bravo. In 2018, he started hosting his own podcast called "The Vale Tudo Hour".

Acting roles

References

External links
 

1975 births
Living people
American male actors
American practitioners of Brazilian jiu-jitsu